Calineuria is a genus of common stoneflies in the family Perlidae. There are about seven described species in Calineuria.

Species
These seven species belong to the genus Calineuria:
 Calineuria californica (Banks, 1905) (western stone)
 Calineuria crassicauda Uchida, 1983
 Calineuria infurcata Uchida, 1990
 Calineuria jezoensis (Okamoto, 1912)
 Calineuria komatsui Uchida, 1990
 Calineuria pectinata Uchida, 1990
 Calineuria stigmatica (Klapálek, 1907)

References

Further reading

 
 

Perlidae
Articles created by Qbugbot